Purcy Walker (born November 11, 1951) is an American politician who served in the Oklahoma House of Representatives from the 60th district from 2000 to 2012.

References

1951 births
Living people
Democratic Party members of the Oklahoma House of Representatives